Berezin (feminine: Berezina) is a Russian surname which may refer to:

People
 Aleksei Berezin (born 1993), Russian footballer
 André Berezin (born 1960), Brazilian rower
 Evelyn Berezin (1925–2018), American computer designer best known for designing the first computer-driven word processor
 Felix Berezin (1931-1980), Russian mathematician and physicist
 Fyodor Berezin (born 1960), Ukrainian science fiction writer
 Ilya Berezin (1818–1896), Russian orientalist
Irina Berezina, chess player
 Lori Berezin, American writer, actress, artist
 Mabel Berezin, sociologist at Cornell University
 Maxim Berezin (born 1991), Russian Ice hockey player
 Pyotr Berezin (born 1991), Russian footballer
 Sergei Berezin (born 1971), Russian hockey player
 Sergei Berezin (footballer) (born 1960), Russian footballer
 Tanya Berezin (born 1941), American actress, educator and co-founder and artistic director of the Circle Repertory Company
 Vladimir Berezin (born 1941), Russian swimmer
 Vladimir Berezin (TV presenter) (born 1957), Russian actor, journalist and TV and radio presenter

Other uses
 Berezin B-20, 20mm caliber autocannon
 Berezin integral, mathematical way of defining integration
 The Berezin UB Soviet aircraft machine gun
 Exercise Berezin was a Soviet military exercise that took place in the Byelorussian SSR in February 1978
 Jewish (eastern Ashkenazic): habitational name for someone from any of various villages called Berez(i)no, Berez(i)na, and Bereza, in Belarus and Ukraine, all derived from an Eastern Slavic noun meaning ‘birch tree’. Russian: topographic name for someone who lived by a birch tree, from Russian bereza ‘birch’ + the Russian possessive suffix -in.

Russian-language surnames